Bad Königshofen im Grabfeld is a small spa town in the German state of Bavaria, located in the Rhön-Grabfeld district in northeast Lower Franconia, Bavaria, Germany. According to the Bavarian State Office for Statistics and Data, Bad Königshofen had a population of 5,995 in 2017. The Franconian Saale flows through the town.

Geography 
There are 17 town districts:

It is only  from the state of Thuringia.

The city is twinned with Arlington, Texas, USA. Bad Königshofen has a downtown recreational park named "Arlington" in honor of the city of Arlington. In 2006, the City of Arlington opened a water park named "Bad Königshofen Family Aquatic Center" in honor of the city of Bad Königshofen.

History
First mention of the town was in 741, although it had been settled way before then. Graves marked from as early as the 6th century have been found. There are Christian and pagan burials in this Festung Road cemetery. Artifacts found in the graves included a longsword and pottery. An even older cemetery found on Bamberger Road shows evidence of settlement in the 4th century.

During the Middle Ages, the town was ruled by tribal duchies as the Duchy of Franconia. The town was granted a city charter in 1235. Königshofen was owned by the House of Henneberg in 1200. In 1353, the heiress Elisabeth of Henneberg married Eberhard II, Count of Württemberg and he sold the town in 1354 to the bishops of Würzburg. They subsequently expanded the town into a fortress. The House of Henneberg acquired the castle in 1400 and in 1412 they bought the entire town back from the Würzburg monastery. Later, the town became home to an episcopal bailiff. In 1603, there was a Leper colony called the Siechhaus in the town.

Government

The elections in March 2014 showed the following results:
CSU: 5 seats
SPD: 2 seats
Greens: 1 seat
Block Freier Wähler (Free voters): 2 seats
List Merkershausen: 2 seats
Bürgerblock der Stadtteile: 2 seats
List Eyershausen: 2 seats
List Althausen: 1 seat
List Untereßfeld: 1 seat
Junge Liste (young list): 1 seat
Aktive Bürger Bad Königshofen (Active citizens Bad Königshofen) 1 seat

Notable people 
 Gaspar Schott (1608-1666),  science writer and educator
 Louis Rousseau (1724-1794), German chemist
 Charles Albert (1743-1819), sculptor of the Rococo 
 Alois Albert (1880-1939), politician (BVP), member of the Reichstag
 Sieglinde Hofmann (born 1945), former member of the Red Army Faction (RAF)
 Waldemar Heckel (born 1949), leading authority and historian of Alexander the Great

Associated people 
 Andreas Baader (1943-1977), leading terrorist of the Red Army Faction (RAF)

See also 
 Asteroid 435950 Bad Königshofen, named after the spa town

References 

 Bad Konigshofen Water Park in Arlington, TX  http://www.recmanagement.com/200705aw1i.php

Spa towns in Germany
Rhön-Grabfeld
Economy of Arlington, Texas